USS Willamette has been the name of more than one United States Navy ship, and may refer to:

 , a sloop-of-war or frigate cancelled in 1866 before her keel was laid
 , a fleet replenishment oiler in commission from 1982 to 1999

United States Navy ship names